is best known as an expert commentator on the Japanese television show Iron Chef. Hattori is also the fifth president of the Hattori Nutrition College; the Iron Chef end credits mention that the program is "produced in cooperation with" the College. Hattori received a PhD from Showa University.

Career

In the English-dubbed version of Iron Chef, shown on the U.S. Food Network and Australia's SBS network, Hattori was often referred to as "Doc" by the show's announcer, Kenji Fukui. After being introduced, Hattori typically responded, "Always a pleasure." While his main role on the show was as a commentator, Hattori took the place of Chairman Takeshi Kaga at least once when the chairman "boycotted" Kitchen Stadium to protest the poor performance of his Iron Chefs. (The boycott was scripted in the show, as Kaga had another taping schedule that night.) Hattori also challenged the Iron Chefs at least twice. His first battle, in 1994, was against Iron Chef Japanese Rokusaburo Michiba; truffles were the theme ingredient. In his second battle, in 1998, he faced off against Iron Chef Japanese Koumei Nakamura over tuna. Hattori lost both battles.

In episode 7 of Yakitate!! Japan, Hattori was a special guest of one of the judges in the baking contest. He also serves as a semi-regular commentator and judge on the Japanese TV program Ai no Eepuron (Apron of Love).

Hattori's voice in the English-dubbed version of Iron Chef is supplied by Canadian-born voice actor Scott Morris.

Hattori taped an appearance in season 2 of The Next Iron Chef.

Hattori also served as an expert commentator on the series Ai no Apron (愛のエプロン), a show where celebrities would attempt to make dishes, do so either successfully or horribly, and be judged on their food.

References

External links
Hattori Nutrition College (in Japanese)
 

1945 births
Living people
Japanese television personalities
People from Tokyo
Rikkyo University alumni